Battle of La Victoria may refer to:

 Battle of La Victoria (1812)
 Battle of La Victoria (1814)

See also
 Battle of Victoria (disambiguation)